Kvitka "Kasey" Cisyk (Kvitka Tsisyk; April 4, 1953 – March 29, 1998) was an American coloratura soprano of Ukrainian ethnicity. Cisyk, a classically trained opera singer, achieved success in four musical genres: popular music, classical opera, Ukrainian folk music and commercial jingles for radio and TV advertisements.

Cisyk recorded her version of "You Light Up My Life" for the film of the same title (Oscar and Golden Globe Awards win in 1978), sang the "Have you driven a Ford lately?" and "You deserve a break today!" jingles, and released two critically acclaimed albums of Ukrainian songs.

Early life
Cisyk was the daughter of two Ukrainian immigrants from Eastern Galicia; her given name, Kvitka, is Ukrainian for "flower". Her father, Volodymyr Cisyk, a well known Ukrainian concert violinist and teacher, taught his daughter the violin when she was five years old, grooming her for a career as a classical musician.

Education
Cisyk attended the High School of Music & Art in New York City and graduated in 1970. She attended Harpur College, also known as SUNY Binghamton, for one year directly after high school. Her sister taught piano there. In the summer of 1971, she attended a SUNY-sponsored opera program in Ghent, Belgium. She received a violin scholarship to the Mannes College of Music, but had switched to classical voice training by the time of her graduation.

Popular music career
Cisyk's original goal was a career as an opera singer, but her father's death left the family without a source of income. Needing to earn money immediately, Cisyk pursued a career as a session singer in popular music. She drew her professional name (Kasey) from her first and last initials.

Cisyk began singing in clubs, while submitting audition tapes to producers and advertising agencies. She had a successful career as a background singer in popular music, working as a backup singer for Carly Simon and Michael Franks and for artists produced by Quincy Jones.

Commercial jingle career
Cisyk achieved her widest success as a singer of the musical jingles used in TV and radio commercials. Cisyk's recording of the slogan "Have you driven a Ford lately?" was used in Ford commercials from 1981 to 1998; in 1989, Ford executives estimated that Cisyk's recording of that phrase had been heard 20 billion times.

During a career that lasted more than twenty years, Cisyk had skills so highly valued that competitors within the same industry sought her services.  She sang the phrase "You deserve a break today" for McDonald's, but also recorded commercials for Burger King.

In addition to Ford, Cisyk sang for automakers General Motors and Toyota. She recorded spots for the three national television networks in the 1980s (ABC, NBC and CBS), four major airlines (American, Delta, Eastern and TWA), two national retailers (Sears and JC Penney), and the two most popular soft drinks: Coca-Cola and Pepsi.

According to her New York Times obituary, "a typical day, she later recalled, would begin with a 9 am session for Trans World Airlines, followed by Coca-Cola at eleven, Hartz Mountain at 1 pm, Eastern Airlines at two, Datsun at three, L'Eggs at five, McDonald's at six, and, after all that, a recording session from 8:30 pm to 3 am".

Cisyk's list of commercial credits also include Mr. Pibb, Safeway grocery stores, and Starburst candies.

Soundtrack performances

Cisyk's work in commercials brought her to the attention of Joe Brooks, who worked as a composer and arranger of jingles. Brooks, who wrote, directed and composed the score for the movie You Light Up My Life chose Cisyk to dub the singing voice of actress Didi Conn.

Cisyk's performance of the song appears on the original soundtrack album, and was released as a single, although she was not listed as the performing artist in the final credits of the film (for which she successfully sued the producers). Her single release of the song reached No. 80 on the Billboard Hot 100 charts.

The song was also recorded by singer Debby Boone, with Brooks producing and arranging. This recording of "You Light Up My Life", became a No. 1 single on the Billboard chart for ten consecutive weeks. People magazine ran a substantial article about "The real voice behind 'You Light Up My Life" inasmuch the similarity between her and Debby Boone's voice led many to assume the latter had sung the songs in the movie.  In a 2013 biographical essay about Cisyk, Cisyk's second husband, Ed Rakowicz wrote, that Brooks "withheld payment ... tried to evade payment by false promises and by asking her to be an incidental actor in his film, implying huge rewards yet to come..." Later, (according to Rakowicz's biographical essay), Brooks made improper advances toward Cisyk, and after being rebuffed, didn't speak directly to her again, and continued to evade payments to her.  Rakowicz writes, "[Kasey] retained a lawyer and sued Brooks for the fees she earned for her work on the record and the film but accepted an award of a small sum just to relieve herself of the torment of a prolonged legal battle with Brooks." Later in  2009  Joseph Brooks, became the subject of an investigation after being accused of a series of casting-couch rapes.  He was indicted in May 2009 by the state Supreme Court for Manhattan (a trial-level court) on 91 counts of rape, sexual abuse, criminal sexual act, assault, and other charges. While awaiting trial, Brooks killed himself in May, 2011.

Cisyk also recorded lead vocals for the soundtracks of the movies The One and Only and Circle of Two. She also contributed backing vocals to the Carly Simon songs used on the soundtrack for the movie Working Girl.

Ukrainian music
As the daughter of Ukrainian immigrants, Cisyk was raised with Ukrainian music, and she is well known in the Ukrainian-speaking world for her two albums of Ukrainian songs. According to Cisyk she recorded these albums because her colleagues often asked her to "show them something Ukrainian, but there were no records worthy of being shown".

In 1980 she recorded her first album, Kvitka, Songs of Ukraine which won top honors in the 1988 Ukrainian Music Awards.

Her second album, Kvitka, Two Colors, was released in 1989. was dedicated to "the spirit of the Ukrainian soul, whose wings can never be broken." Today, songs from both albums continue to be heard on radio in Ukraine.

Both albums were nominated for a Grammy Award for Best Contemporary Folk Album.

Both Songs of Ukraine and Two Colors were family projects. Cisyk's second husband, Ed Rakowicz, a recording engineer, produced them; her first husband, Jack Cortner arranged and conducted them. Her sister, Maria Cisyk, a concert pianist and teacher, performed the solo piano selections on the record, and her mother, Ivanna, made sure her Ukrainian pronunciation was perfect.

Death and legacy
Kvitka Cisyk Rakowicz died on March 29, 1998, six days before her 45th birthday. She died of breast cancer.  

For what would have been the singer’s 60th birthday, Ukrainian Inter TV channel broadcast a documentary film Kvitka. Single copy voice. The film examined the phenomenon of her life and career, and interviewed her relatives and close friends: husband Ed Rakowicz, son Eddie, family from Lviv and the United States, as well as peers and fans. On April 4, 2013 premieres of the film took place in Kyiv, Lviv, Ternopil, Ivano-Frankivsk, Odesa, Luhansk and Chernivtsi. The film debuted on Inter TV channel on April 5, 2013.

Her contribution to Ukrainian music is recognized with a yearly music festival. A street was also named for her in Lviv, Ukraine. In September 2022 a street that was named after Soviet child actress Gulya Korolyova in Dnipro was renamed to honor Cisyk.

Recordings

Solo albums
Kvitka, Songs of Ukraine 1980
Kvitka, Two Colors 1989

Credits/participations

References

External links
New York Times obituary
[ Allmusic.com discography]

Review of first album, with music clips from selected songs
Los Angeles Times obituary
Obituary for Kvitka Cisyk
J. Walter Thompson demo for Ford, featuring Casey Cisyk
 The song "Я піду в далекі гори" performed by Kvitka Cisyk is used in the video from Dora, near Yaremche. English translation of lyrics is made by Kateryna Pylypchuk.

1953 births
1998 deaths
American folk singers
American people of Ukrainian descent
American women pop singers
Deaths from cancer in New York (state)
Deaths from breast cancer
American operatic sopranos
People from Queens, New York
20th-century American women opera singers
The High School of Music & Art alumni
Harpur College alumni
Mannes School of Music alumni